Ellbögen is a community in the district of Innsbruck Land and lies 12 km south of Innsbruck. It is a scattered village located on the eastern valley side of the Wipptal.

References

External links
 Town History (German)

Cities and towns in Innsbruck-Land District